Cancellopollia ustulata is a species of sea snail, a marine gastropod mollusk in the family Pisaniidae, the true whelks and the like.

Description

Distribution
This marine species occurs in the Coral Sea.

References

 Vermeij, G. & Bouchet, P., 1998. New Pisaniinae (Mollusca, Gastropoda, Buccinidae) from New Caledonia, with remarks on Cantharus and remated genera. Zoosystema 20(3): 471-485

External links

Pisaniidae
Gastropods described in 1998